Jean-Marie Houben (born 24 November 1966) is a Belgian former footballer. He played in two matches for the Belgium national football team in 1989.

References

External links
 

1966 births
Living people
Belgian footballers
Belgium international footballers
Association football defenders
Footballers from Liège